The governor or governor-general of the Habsburg Netherlands was a representative appointed by the Holy Roman emperor (1504-1556), the king of Spain (1556-1598, 1621-1706), and the archduke of Austria (1716-1794), to administer the Burgundian inheritance of the House of Habsburg in the Low Countries when the monarch was absent from the territory. The role of the governor-generals significantly changed over time: initially tutors and advisors of Emperor Charles V, who lived at the Palace of Coudenberg, they served as generals during the 80 Years War between the Kingdom of Spain and the Dutch Republic. Frequently, the governor-general was a close relative of the Austrian or Spanish monarchs, though at other times Spanish or German noblemen filled the role. The governor-general was usually based in Brussels.

List of governors 

Thereafter, the French revolutionaries occupied the Low Countries until 1815.  The Emperor formally recognized the loss of these territories by the Treaty of Lunéville of 1801.  At the Congress of Vienna, in 1815, the Low Countries were re-united in a personal union under the House of Orange-Nassau. In 1830, Belgium declared its independence.

See also 
 Lord Chamberlain of the Archduchess
 List of plenipotentiaries of Austrian Netherlands
 List of rulers of the Netherlands

 
Netherlands
Politicians of the Austrian Netherlands
Habsburg